Teddy Bertin (born August 6, 1969, in Flixecourt) is a retired French footballer and current manager. He is currently the manager of Boulogne-Billancourt AC.

Bertin mostly played for Le Havre AC, Olympique de Marseille and RC Strasbourg.

Whilst at Strasbourg, Bertin played in the 2001 Coupe de France Final in which the Alsatians defeated Amiens SC on penalties.

References

External links
 
 

1969 births
Living people
Sportspeople from Somme (department)
French footballers
Amiens SC players
Ligue 1 players
Le Havre AC players
Olympique de Marseille players
RC Strasbourg Alsace players
LB Châteauroux players
Association football defenders
Footballers from Hauts-de-France